The 1882–83 season was the 12th season of competitive football in England.

National team

* England score given first

Key
 H = Home match

Honours

Notes = Number in parentheses is the times that club has won that honour. * indicates new record for competition

References

External links